Tiger attacks in the Sundarbans, in India and Bangladesh are estimated to kill from 0-50 (mean of 22.7 between 1947 and 1983) people per year. The Sundarbans is home to over 100  Bengal tigers, one of the largest single populations of tigers in one area. Before modern times, Sundarbans tigers were said to "regularly kill fifty or sixty people a year".

These tigers are slightly smaller and slimmer than those elsewhere in India but remain extremely powerful and are infamous for destroying small wooden boats. They are not the only tigers who live close to humans; in Bandhavgarh, villages encircle the tiger reserves, and yet attacks on people are rare. Although attacks were stalled temporarily in 2004 with new precautions, they have been on the rise. This is particularly due to the devastation on the Bangladeshi side of the swamp caused by Cyclone Sidr which has deprived tigers of traditional food sources (due to the natural upheaval) and has pushed them over towards the more populated Indian side of the swamp.

Precautions
The locals and government officials take certain precautions to prevent attacks. Local Hindu fishermen will say prayers and perform rituals to the forest goddess Bonbibi before setting out on expeditions. Invocations to the tiger god Dakshin Ray are also considered a necessity by the local populace for safe passage throughout the Sundarbans area. Fishermen and bushmen originally created masks made to look like faces to wear on the back of their heads because tigers always attack from behind. This worked for a short time, but the tigers quickly caught on to the ruse, and the attacks reportedly continued. One local honey gatherer, Surendra Jana, 57, summarised the general feeling of the tigers adapting to their efforts: "Before we could understand the way they attacked...We don't feel safe any more, knowing our brothers have been attacked in spite of the tricks we use." Government officials wear stiff pads that rise up the back of the neck, similar to the pads of an American football player. This is to prevent the tigers from biting into the spine, which is their favoured attack method.

Causes of the attacks
No one is exactly sure why the tigers of the Sundarbans are so aggressive towards humans, but scientists, biologists, and others have speculated about a number of reasons. These include:
 Since the Sundarbans is located in a coastal area, the water is relatively salty. In all other habitats, tigers drink fresh water. It is rumored that the saltiness of the water in this area has put them in a state of constant discomfort, leading them to be extremely aggressive. Freshwater lakes have been artificially made but to no avail.
 The high tides in the area destroy the tiger's urine and scat which serve as territorial markers. Thus, the only way for a tiger to defend its territory is to physically dominate everything that enters.
 Another possibility is that these tigers have grown used to human flesh due to the weather. Cyclones in this part of India and Bangladesh kill thousands, and the bodies drift out in to the swampy waters, where tigers scavenge them.
 Another possibility is that the tigers find hunting animals difficult due to the continuous high and low tides making the area marsh-like and slippery. Humans travel through the Sundarbans on boats gathering honey and fishing, making for easy prey. It is also believed that when a person stops to work, the tiger mistakes them for a typical prey animal, and has, over time, acquired a 'taste' for the human flesh.
 It has also been hypothesized that the tigers in this area, due to their secluded habitat, avoided the brunt of the hunting sprees that occurred over the course of the 20th century. Tigers inhabiting the rest of Asia developed a fear of humans after these events, but tigers in the Sundarbans would never have had reason to stop seeing humans as prey.

About 5,000 people frequent the swamps and waterways of the Sundarbans. Fishing boats traverse the area and many stop to collect firewood, honey and other items. In the dark forest, tigers find it easy to stalk and attack men absorbed in their work. Even fishermen in small boats have been attacked due to tigers' strong swimming abilities.

Responses to the attacks
Local villagers, who fear tiger attacks and resent the animal for killing their livestock, sometimes engage in revenge killings. On one occasion, a tiger had attacked and wounded the people in a village in south-west Bangladesh (near the Sundarbans) and frequently preyed upon their livestock. This roused the wrath of the villagers, and the feline became a target for their retribution. Poachers are also responsible for killing tigers in the reserve in an effort to sell them on the black market.

The human death rate has dropped significantly due to better management techniques and fewer people are killed each year. Even at the rate of fifty or sixty kills per year, humans would provide only about three percent of the yearly food requirements for the tiger population of the Sundarbans. Thus, humans are only a supplement to the tiger's diet; they do not provide a primary food source. This does not mean that the notoriety associated with this area is unfounded. Even if only 3% of a tiger's diet is human meat, that still amounts to the tiger killing and eating about one person per year, given the amount of food a tiger typically eats.

Villagers in the area have agreed to occasionally release livestock into the forest in order to provide an alternative food source for the tigers and discourage them from entering the villages. The government has agreed to subsidize the project to encourage village participation.

See also
 Roar: Tigers of the Sundarbans

References

Further reading
 
 
</

Felidae attacks
Tigers in India
Sundarbans
Mammals of Bangladesh
Mammals of India
Environment of West Bengal